Selsingen is a Samtgemeinde ("collective municipality") in the district of Rotenburg, in Lower Saxony, Germany. Its seat is in the village Selsingen.

The Samtgemeinde Selsingen consists of the following municipalities:
 Anderlingen 
 Deinstedt 
 Farven 
 Ostereistedt 
 Rhade 
 Sandbostel 
 Seedorf 
 Selsingen

Samtgemeinden in Lower Saxony